Hypsochromic shift (from ancient Greek ὕψος (upsos) "height"; and χρῶμα chrōma, "color") is a change of spectral band position in the absorption, reflectance, transmittance, or emission spectrum of a molecule to a shorter wavelength (higher frequency). Because the blue color in the visible spectrum has a shorter wavelength than most other colors, this effect is also commonly called a blue shift.

This can occur because of a change in environmental conditions: for example, a change in solvent polarity will result in solvatochromism.  A series of structurally related molecules in a substitution series can also show a hypsochromic shift.  Hypsochromic shift is a phenomenon seen in molecular spectra, not atomic spectra - it is thus more common to speak of the movement of the peaks in the spectrum rather than lines.

 where  is the wavelength of the spectral peak of interest and 

For example, β-acylpyrrole will show a hypsochromic shift of 30-40 nm in comparison with α-acylpyrroles.

See also
Bathochromic shift, a change in band position to a longer wavelength (lower frequency).

Spectroscopy
Chromism